Mohamed Jasim Mohamed Ali Abdulla Marhoon (born 12 February 1998) is a Bahraini footballer who plays as a midfielder for Al-Riffa and the Bahrain national team.

Career
Marhoon was included in Bahrain's squad for the 2019 AFC Asian Cup in the United Arab Emirates.

Career statistics

International

International goals

References

External links
 
 
 
 
 Mohamed Marhoon at WorldFootball.com
Mohamed Marhoon at the-afc.com 

1998 births
Living people
Bahraini footballers
Bahrain international footballers
Association football midfielders
Sitra Club players
Riffa SC players
Bohemians 1905 players
Bahraini Premier League players
Czech First League players
Footballers at the 2018 Asian Games
Asian Games competitors for Bahrain
2019 AFC Asian Cup players
Bahrain youth international footballers